The Uganda Land Commission (ULC) is a semi-autonomous land verification, monitoring and preservation organisation, owned by the Ugandan government, that is mandated to document, verify, preserve and maintain land owned and/or administered by the government.

Location
The headquarters of ULC are located on the 4th Floor, Nakawa Business Park, at 3-5 New Port Bell Road, in the Nakawa neighborhood of Kampala, Uganda's capital and largest city. The coordinates of the Commission's head office are:0°19'39.0"N, 32°36'45.0"E (Latitude:0.327500; Longitude:32.612500).

Overview
The ULC was created by the Ugandan Parliament in 1995. The mission of the ULC is to hold and manage all land in Uganda legally owned or acquired by Government in accordance with the Constitution of Uganda. The Commission is also responsible for holding and managing land owned by Uganda, outside of the country. However, that second mandate may be delegated to Uganda's  Missions abroad. The Commission is governed by a full-time Chairperson, assisted by up to eight part-time Commissioners. The Commission's Secretariat is headed by the Secretary who is assisted by the Undersecretary. The Undersecretary heads three distinct functional units namely; (a) Finance and Administration, (b) Technical Support and (c) Land Fund.

Governance
The institution is governed by a six-person board of directors. As of April 2019, the following individuals were members of that board.

 Beatrice Byenkya: Chairperson 
 Pen-Mogi Nyeko: Member
 Asuman Kyafu: Member
 Stella Achan: Member 
 Rukiika Bujara: Member
 Charles Muhoozi: Member

Past chairpersons of the Uganda Land Commission include the following:
 Jehoash Mayanja Nkangi: From 2002 to 2012. 
 Baguma Isoke: From 2013 to 2019.
 Beatrice Byenkya: From 2019 until present.

See also
 Economy of Uganda
  Ugandan Ministry of Lands Housing and Urban Development

References

External links
Uganda Land Commission failed in its mandate - Isoke As at 14 February 2018. 

Organizations established in 1995
Kampala District
1995 establishments in Uganda